Balikaria, also spelled as Bali Karia, is a village in Nalbari district, Assam, India. According to the 2011 Census of India, Balikaria has a population of 6,359 people including 3,305 males and 3,054 females with literacy rate of 86.54%.  The 500 years old Kharzara Ashram is located on Balikaria. It's the oldest Ashram of Assam.

References 

Villages in Nalbari district